Rubus ulmifolius is a species of wild blackberry known by the English common name elmleaf blackberry or thornless blackberry and the Spanish common name zarzamora. It is native to Europe and North Africa, and has also become naturalized in parts of the United States (especially California), Australia, and southern South America.

Description
Rubus ulmifolius is a brambly shrub sometimes as much as 5 meters (almost 17 feet) tall, sometimes with spines but not always. Leaves are palmately compound with 3 or 5 leaflets, the leaflets green on the upper surface but white on the underside because of a dense layer of woolly hairs. Flowers are usually pink, sometimes white. The fruit is a compound drupe, dark purple, almost black.

Reproduction
Rubus ulmifolius is unique among subgenus Rubus in displaying normal sexual reproduction; all other species are facultative apomicts.

Distribution and Habitat
Rubus ulmifolius is found in its native range across Western Europe, from the Netherlands south to Spain and Portugal, in Britain and Ireland, as well as NW Africa. It is naturalised in North America, Australasia and South Africa. In Britain and Ireland it is a plant of hedges and woodland edges on calcareous soils.

Subspecies
Rubus sanctus is often considered to be a subspecies of R. ulmifolius.

References

External links
 
 
 
 
 

ulmifolius
Plants described in 1818
Flora of Europe
Berries
Edible fruits